Teddy Alloh (born 23 January 2002) is a French professional footballer who plays as a left-back for Belgian First Division A club Eupen.

Career
A former youth academy player of Paris FC, Alloh joined Paris Saint-Germain (PSG) in 2015. He signed his first professional contract on 29 June 2020, tying him to the club until June 2023. On 14 July 2021, he made his first appearance for the senior team in a 4–0 friendly win over Le Mans.

On 20 January 2022, Alloh joined Belgian club Eupen on loan until the end of the season. On 6 September 2022, he signed a three-year contract with Eupen until June 2025.

Personal life
Born in France, Alloh is of Ivorian descent.

Career statistics

References

External links
 
 Teddy Alloh Ligue 1 profile

2002 births
Living people
Footballers from Paris
French footballers
French sportspeople of Ivorian descent
Black French sportspeople
Association football defenders
Paris Saint-Germain F.C. players
K.A.S. Eupen players
Championnat National 3 players
Belgian Pro League players
French expatriate footballers
French expatriate sportspeople in Belgium
Expatriate footballers in Belgium